KBWD (1380 AM, "Magic 1380") is a radio station licensed to serve Brownwood, Texas, United States. It was launched in 1941 as the first radio station in Brownwood. The station is currently owned by the Brown County Broadcasting Company.

KBWD broadcasts an adult contemporary music format, including some programming from Citadel Media.

In popular culture
The station is featured in a  music video by Coffey Anderson titled "15 Minutes".

References

External links

BWD
Mainstream adult contemporary radio stations in the United States
Brown County, Texas